Troy Andersen (born April 23, 1999) is an American football linebacker for the Atlanta Falcons of the National Football League (NFL). He played college football at Montana State where previously played quarterback, running back and fullback for them before moving to linebacker. He was named a FCS All-American and the Big Sky Conference defensive player of the year in 2021.

Early life and high school
Andersen was born on April 23, 1999, and grew up on his family's cattle ranch in Dillon, Montana. He attended Beaverhead County High School, where he played quarterback and safety for their football team, as well as on their basketball and track teams. As a senior, Andersen was named first-team All-State at quarterback and safety, as well as the Montana Defensive Player of the Year, after he passed for 1,403 yards, rushed for 877 yards, and scored 30 total touchdowns on offense and had 71 tackles with three interceptions and two fumbles recovered on defense while Beaverhead won the Class A state championship.

College career
Andersen started games at both running back and linebacker as a true freshman and was named the Big Sky Conference Freshman of the Year after rushing for 515 yards and five touchdowns with seven receptions for 45 yards and one touchdown on offense on offense and recording nine tackles with one sack on defense. He moved to quarterback before his sophomore season after two-year starter Chris Murray was ruled academically ineligible to play. Andersen completed 115 of 208 passes for 1,195 yards with three touchdowns and seven interceptions and also rushed for 1,412 yards and a school-record 21 touchdowns and was named first-team All-Big Sky.

Andersen moved back to linebacker and also played fullback as a junior. He was named first-team all-conference after finishing the season with 54 tackles, 11.5 for loss, and 6.5 sacks with one interception and five passes broken up. Andersen redshirted his senior season while recovering from injuries. As a redshirt senior, Andersen was named the Big Sky Defensive Player of the Year and was the runner-up for the Buck Buchanan Award. Andersen played in the 2022 Senior Bowl.

Professional career

Andersen was drafted 58th overall by the Atlanta Falcons in the 2022 NFL Draft. The Falcons previously obtained the pick in the trade that sent Julio Jones to the Tennessee Titans. Andersen made his season debut in Week 2 against the Los Angeles Rams. In Week 6 against the San Francisco 49ers, Andersen made his first professional start, where had a season-high 13 tackles in the 28–14 win.

Personal life
Andersen is a cousin of Major League Baseball pitcher Codi Heuer. His father played college basketball at Eastern Oregon University, while his sister ran track at Montana State. Andersen graduated from Montana State with a degree in agricultural business in May 2021.

References

Notes

External links
 Atlanta Falcons bio
Montana State Bobcats bio

1999 births
Living people
Players of American football from Montana
People from Dillon, Montana
American football linebackers
American football quarterbacks
American football running backs
American football fullbacks
Montana State Bobcats football players
Atlanta Falcons players